Me First is the first album by indie band The Elected, released in 2004 via Sub Pop. It is a mix between indie and country.

Track listing
All songs written by Blake Sennett, except where noted.
"7 September 2003" – 3:56
"Greetings in Braille" – 3:58
"My Baby's a Dick" – 3:31
"A Time for Emily" – 2:23
"Don't Get Your Hopes Up" – 3:30
"Waves (The Time That You're Awake)" (Sennett, Blake Klugman) – 3:35
"The Miles 'Til Home" – 5:10
"Go On" – 5:17
"C'mon, Mom" – 4:35
"A Response to Greed" – 3:56
"Don't Blow It" – 4:10
"British Columbia" –  2:36

References

External links
The Elected on MySpace

The Elected albums
2004 debut albums
Sub Pop albums